Stephanolepis is a genus of bony fish in the family Monacanthidae, the filefishes. Members of this genus are unusual-shaped fish and have a very rough skin which gives them their common name. They are laterally flattened and deep bodied with long dorsal and anal fins and a fan-shaped tail. They have a mouth at the tip of the projecting snout and a long spine on the top of the head.

Species
There are currently 5 recognized species in this genus:
 Stephanolepis auratus  (Castelnau, 1861) (Porky)
 Stephanolepis cirrhifer  (Temminck & Schlegel, 1850) (Threadsail filefish)
 Stephanolepis diaspros  Fraser-Brunner, 1940 (Reticulated leatherjacket) 
 Stephanolepis hispidus  (Linnaeus, 1766) (Planehead filefish)
 Stephanolepis setifer  (E. T. Bennett, 1831) (Pygmy filefish)

References

Monacanthidae
Taxa named by Theodore Gill
Marine fish genera